The 2016 East Asia Cup was a Twenty20 (T20) cricket tournament, which was held in Japan in November 2016. The matches were all played at the Sano International Cricket Ground in the city of Sano.

The Twenty20 East Asia Cup is an annual competition featuring China, Hong Kong, Japan and South Korea that was first played in 2015 and alternates annually between a men's and women's event. This was the first edition of the men's event, after China won the inaugural women's edition in 2015. Matches did not have Twenty20 International status. Hong Kong was represented by the Hong Kong Dragons side, a team representing Hong Kong's Chinese community, instead of the full national side.

South Korea defeated hosts Japan in the final on 6 November 2016 to win the East Asia Cup.

Squads

Round-robin

Points table

Matches

Play-offs

Third-place play-off

Final

References

External links
 Series home at ESPN Cricinfo

International cricket competitions in 2016–17
2016 Men's Twenty20 East Asia Cup